Castlewood is a census-designated place (CDP) in Russell County, Virginia, United States. The population was 2,045 at the 2010 census, a small increase from the 2,036 reported in 2000. Castlewood was an incorporated town from 1991 to 1997, when it reverted to unincorporated status.

History
It was originally named Castle's Wood's, as the land in the immediate area had once belonged to Jacob Castle, a frontiersman in the likes of Daniel Boone. Castle purchased the land from the Shawnee Indians, for very little in trade.  It is reported that the purchase was made with the Shawnee Indians for a "hound dog, a knife, and a shot of whiskey. As a "Long Hunter", he spent long periods of time in the wilderness on hunting expeditions.  There he befriended the Indians that inhabited the land in the Castlewood area.  He married a Shawnee woman by the name of Gliding Swan, and they produced many children. It has been said that Castle himself showed Daniel Boone the Cumberland Gap and areas west, which led to Boone's expedition and settlement of said lands.  Many descendants of Castle reside in Russell County, Virginia and the surrounding area.  Castle's father, Peter Cassell was a German emigrant to Pennsylvania who was influential in the Dutch movement to America.
The name was modified to Castlewood by the United States Postal Service in the late 1800s, as a simplification of the original spelling and pronunciation, which was common during this time period.

The Castlerun Historic District and Mason-Dorton School are listed on the National Register of Historic Places.

Geography
Castlewood is located at  (36.878614, −82.289229).

According to the United States Census Bureau, the CDP has a total area of 7.2 square miles (18.7 km2), of which, 7.2 square miles (18.6 km2) of it is land and 0.14% is water.

Demographics
As of the census of 2000, there were 2,036 people, 872 households, and 637 families residing in the CDP. The population density was 283.0 people per square mile (109.3/km2). There were 950 housing units at an average density of 132.1 per square mile (51.0/km2). The racial makeup of the CDP was 98.48% White, 0.93% African American, 0.10% Native American, 0.05% from other races, and 0.44% from two or more races. Hispanic or Latino of any race were 0.44% of the population.

There were 872 households, out of which 27.3% had children under the age of 18 living with them, 59.3% were married couples living together, 9.9% had a female householder with no husband present, and 26.9% were non-families. 25.3% of all households were made up of individuals, and 12.6% had someone living alone who was 65 years of age or older. The average household size was 2.32 and the average family size was 2.76.

In the CDP, the population was spread out, with 20.4% under the age of 18, 7.7% from 18 to 24, 26.3% from 25 to 44, 27.8% from 45 to 64, and 17.9% who were 65 years of age or older. The median age was 42 years. For every 100 females, there were 93.2 males. For every 100 females age 18 and over, there were 90.5 males.

The median income for a household in the CDP was $27,232, and the median income for a family was $31,435. Males had a median income of $30,795 versus $16,576 for females. The per capita income for the CDP was $14,203. About 13.3% of families and 16.3% of the population were below the poverty line, including 23.4% of those under age 18 and 8.4% of those age 65 or over.

Notable People 
Castlewood is the home of the country band 49 Winchester. Bandmates Isaac Gibson (lead singer/guitarist), Chase Chafin (bassist), Bus Shelton (guitarist), and Noah Patrick (pedal steel) formed the group in Castlewood at a house located at 49 Winchester Street around 2015.

References

Census-designated places in Russell County, Virginia
Census-designated places in Virginia
Former municipalities in Virginia
Populated places disestablished in 1997